Mise-en-scène (or "what is put into the scene") is the stage design and arrangement of actors in scenes for a theatre or film production, both in visual arts through storyboarding, visual theme, and cinematography, and in narrative storytelling through direction. The term is also commonly used to refer to single scenes that are representative of a film. Mise-en-scène has been called film criticism's "grand undefined term." It has been criticized for its focus on the theatrical or dramatic design aspects rather than the plot itself, as those who utilize mise-en-scène tend to look at what is "put before the camera," rather than the story. The use of mise-en-scène is significant as it allows the director to convey messages to the viewer through what is placed in the scene, not just the content of the scene.

Definition in film studies

When applied to the cinema, mise-en-scène refers to everything that appears before the camera and its arrangement—composition, sets, props, actors, costumes, and lighting. The various elements of design help express a film's vision by generating a sense of time and space, as well as setting a mood, and sometimes suggesting a character's state of mind. Mise-en-scène also includes the composition, which consists of the positioning and movement of actors, as well as objects, in the shot. These are all the areas overseen by the director. One of the most important people that collaborates with the director is the production designer. These two work closely to perfect all of the aspects of the mise-en-scène a considerable amount of time before the actual photography even begins. The production designer is generally responsible for the look of the movie, leading various departments that are in charge of individual sets, locations, props, and costumes, among other things. André Bazin, a French film critic and film theorist, describes the mise-en-scène aesthetic as emphasizing choreographed movement within the scene rather than through editing.

Because of its relationship to shot blocking, mise-en-scène is also a term sometimes used among professional screenwriters to indicate descriptive (action) paragraphs between the dialog.

Key aspects

Set design

An important element of "putting in the scene" is set design—the setting of a scene and the objects (props) visible in a scene. Set design can be used to amplify character emotion or the dominant mood, which has physical, social, psychological, emotional, economic and cultural significance in film. One of the most important decisions made by the production designer and director is deciding whether to shoot on location or on set. The main distinction between the two is that décor and props must be taken into consideration when shooting on set. However, shooting on set is more commonly done than shooting on location as a result of it proving to be more cost-effective.

Lighting
The intensity, direction, and quality of lighting can influence an audience's understanding of characters, actions, themes and mood. Light (and shade) can emphasize texture, shape, distance, mood, time of day or night, season, glamour; it affects the way colors are rendered, both in terms of hue and depth, and can focus attention on particular elements of the composition. Highlights, for example, call attention to shapes and textures, while shadows often conceal things, creating a sense of mystery or fear. For this reason, lighting must be thoroughly planned to ensure its desired effect on an audience. Cinematographers are a large part of this process, as they coordinate the camera and the lighting.

Space
The representation of space affects the reading of a film. Depth, proximity, size and proportions of the places and objects in a film can be manipulated through camera placement and lenses, lighting, set design, effectively determining mood or relationships between elements in the story world.

Composition
Composition is the organization of objects, actors and space within the frame. One of the most important concepts with the regard to the composition of a film is maintaining a balance of symmetry. This refers to having an equal distribution of light, colour, and objects and/or figures in a shot. Unbalanced composition can be used to emphasize certain elements of a film that the director wishes to be given particular attention to. This tool works because audiences are more inclined to pay attention to something off balance, as it may seem abnormal. Where the director places a character can also vary depending on the importance of the role.

Costume
Costume simply refers to the clothes that characters wear. Using certain colors or designs, costumes in narrative cinema are used to signify characters or to make clear distinctions between characters.

Makeup and hairstyles
Makeup and hairstyles establish time period, reveal character traits and signal changes in character.

Acting
There is enormous historical and cultural variation in performance styles in the cinema. In the early years of cinema, stage acting and film acting were difficult to differentiate, as most film actors had previously been stage actors and therefore knew no other method of acting.  Eventually, early melodramatic styles, clearly indebted to the 19th century theater, gave way in Western cinema to a relatively naturalistic style. This more naturalistic style of acting is largely influenced by Konstantin Stanislavski's theory of method acting, which involves the actor fully immersing themselves in their character.

Filmstock
Film stock is the choice of black and white or color, fine-grain or grainy.

Aspect ratio
Aspect ratio is the relation of the width of the rectangular image to its height. Each aspect ratio yields a different way of looking at the world and is basic to the expressive meaning of the film.

See also
 Filmmaking technique of Luis Buñuel

References

Further reading 
 Bordwell, David and Kristin Thompson. "Chapter 6 – The Shot: Mise-en-Scène." In: Film Art: An Introduction. New York: McGraw–Hill, 2010, 9th. ed, pp. 175–228.
 Martin, Adrian. Mise en Scène and Film Style. From Classical Hollywood to New Media Art. Palgrave Macmillan UK, 2014. .

External links 

 Mise-en-scène — encyclopedia.com
 kjera Mise En Scene Analysis – 15 Essential Points slideshare.net
 The Straight Dope: What do artsy film critics mean by mise-en-scene?
 Michael Hall, Mise-en-scène Explained 
 Yale University Film Analysis Site: "mise-en-scene"
 Indy Mogul 4 Minute Film School: Mise en Scene

Lighting
Concepts in film theory